Sinding-Larsen and Johansson syndrome, named after Swedish surgeon Sven Christian Johansson (1880-1959), and Christian Magnus Falsen Sinding-Larsen (1866-1930), a Norwegian physician, is apophysitis of the inferior pole of the patella. It is analogous to Osgood–Schlatter disease which involves the upper margin of the tibia. This variant was discovered in 1908, during a winter indoor Olympic qualifier event in Scandinavia. Sever's disease is a similar condition affecting the heel.

This condition called Sinding-Larsen and Johansson syndrome was described independently by Sinding-Larsen in 1921 and Johansson in 1922.

Signs and symptoms

The condition is usually seen in athletic individuals typically between 10 and 14 years of age. Following a strain or partial rupture of patellar ligament the patient develops a traction ‘tendinitis’ characterized by pain and point tenderness at the inferior (lower) pole of the patella associated with focal swelling.

Children with cerebral palsy are particularly prone to SLJ 4.

Diagnosis
Radiographs
recommended views are
AP and lateral of knee with
findings
may be normal and
may show spur at inferior pole of patella,
MRI indicated
if diagnosis is unclear.
Inflammation best seen on T2 sagitals and
bony spurs best seen on T1 sagitals

Treatment

With rest and quadriceps flexibility exercises the condition settles with no secondary disability. Sometimes, if the condition does not settle, calcification appears in the ligament. This condition is comparable to Osgood-Schlatter's disease and usually recovers spontaneously. If rest fails to provide relief, the abnormal area is removed and the paratenon is stripped.

References

External links 

Chondropathies
Knee injuries and disorders